Parashiva (or Paramashiva, Paramshiva, or Parmshiva, among other spellings; Sanskrit: परशिव, IAST: Paraśiva) is the highest aspect of Shiva in Shaiva Siddhanta and in Kashmir Shaivism. Below him are the primordial Shiva with the Parashakti and Sadashiva with seven Shaktis.

According to the Shaiva Siddhanta tradition, which is a major school of Shaivism, Parashiva is absolute reality which is beyond human comprehension and is beyond all attributes. According to Mahamahopadhaya Gopinath Kaviraj, in this aspect Shiva is both formless and with forms. He is beyond both dvaita and advaita. In Shaivite theology, Parashiva is both the source and the destination of everything in the existence. 

According to the Shaiva Siddhanta tradition, the other two aspects of Shiva are Parashakti and Parameshwara.

The upper part (oval stone) of Shiva Lingam represents Parashiva while lower part (pedestal) represents Parashakti. Parashiva is beyond all of the 36 tattvas mentioned in Shaivism philosophy.

See also
Parashakti
Parameshwara
Brahman
Mahaganapati
Mahavishnu
Nirguna Brahman
Krishna

References

9.Book Name:
Bharatiya Sanskrite Acharya Gopinath Kaviraj er Obodan by Paritosh Das

Forms of Shiva
Shaivism